Highway 968 can include:

Canada
  in Saskatchewan

United States
  in Florida
  in Louisiana
  in Maryland
  in Pennsylvania (former)
  in Puerto Rico